Francesco Vendramin (1555–1619) was a Roman Catholic cardinal.

Biography
On 26 May 1608, he was consecrated bishop by Pope Paul V, with Fabio Biondi, Titular Patriarch of Jerusalem, and Metello Bichi, Bishop Emeritus of Sovana, serving as co-consecrators.

References

1555 births
1619 deaths
17th-century Italian cardinals